Jonathan Mark Hedges (born 24 February 1964) is a British journalist and the editor of Country Life, published by TI Media.

Early life
He was born in Redruth in Cornwall, and grew up near Chipping Norton. He studied geology at Durham University.

Career
Hedges worked at a bloodstock auction house before beginning in journalism with Horse & Hound.

He became the editor of Country Life in 2006.

Personal life
He lives in Hampshire with his wife and three children.

References

External links
 Country Life webpage

1964 births
Alumni of the College of St Hild and St Bede, Durham
Country Life (magazine) people
English magazine editors
People from Chipping Norton
People from Redruth
Living people
People from Ellisfield
People from East Hampshire District